David Rosengarten (born January 25, 1950) is an American chef, author and television personality, who hosted or co-hosted more than 2500 television shows on the Food Network from 1994 to 2001.

Personal life
Rosengarten was born in New York City  to Leonard Rosengarten, a garment industry executive, and Lorraine Stein. He married Constance Childs on October 15, 1983, in a wedding catered by Martha Stewart. His wife is the granddaughter of photographer Shirley Burden and actress Flobelle Fairbanks, who is a niece of actor Douglas Fairbanks. She is also a descendant of Cornelius Vanderbilt through her mother, who is a great-granddaughter of Florence Adele Vanderbilt Twombly and the last surviving granddaughter of the Vanderbilt family's patriarch. His two daughters, Andrea and Sarah, appeared frequently on Rosengarten's Food Network cooking show, which he called Taste. His son, Bjorn Rosengarten-Bowser, has appeared on Martha Stewart's collaborative "Emeril's Table" cooking show.

Rosengarten attended Colgate University where he earned a B.A. in 1971, holds a doctorate in dramatic literature from Cornell University (1980), and was an assistant professor of theater at Skidmore College.

Print
Rosengarten was a contributing editor for Gourmet Magazine from 1995 to 1999, and was that magazine's New York restaurant critic. He published articles in several US newspapers including The New York Times, the New York Daily News, and The New York Observer, and he was the weekly wine columnist of Newsday.

Other magazines and web sites for whom he has written include Food & Wine, Bon Appetit, Harper's Bazaar, Departures, The Wine Spectator, Wine & Spirits, and The Wine Enthusiast; currently, he writes for Saveur, the Huffington Post, and Forbes.

From 2001 to 2007, Rosengarten wrote and published The Rosengarten Report, which in 2003 won a James Beard Award for "best food and wine newsletter." At its height, The Rosengarten Report had 50,000 paid subscribers.

Books
 David Rosengarten Entertains: Fabulous Parties for Food Lovers (with Joshua Wesson) (2004) Wiley 
 The Dean & DeLuca Cookbook (1996), Random House 
 It's All American Food: The Best Recipes for More Than 400 New American Classics (2003) Little, Brown and Company .
 Red Wine with Fish: The New Art of Matching Wine with Food (with Joshua Wesson) (1989), Simon & Schuster 
 Taste: One Palate's Journey through the World's Greatest Dishes (1998), Television Food Network, Random House

Television
Rosengarten's first hosting opportunity on the US channel Food Network was Food News & Views. He then created and hosted the program Taste, which premiered in February 1994 and ran for eight years on the Food Network, and co-hosted In Food Today with Donna Hanover He has also appeared frequently on NBC's Today show.

Entertainment Weekly had the following to say about Taste: "Call it culinary voyeurism, but Taste is a cooking show even take-out addicts will find enthralling. David Rosengarten's orgasmic ruminations on 'lobster synergy' and the textural differences between Lebanese and Portuguese pine nuts will give 'bring to a boil' a whole new meaning."

In the middle of 2012, Rosengarten created a YouTube channel, RosengartenTV.

Travel
Since October 2006, Rosengarten has been organizing and hosting food tours in regions such as the Mediterranean, India and Iceland.

References

External links
 

Cornell University alumni
Colgate University alumni
American male chefs
American television chefs
American food writers
Food Network chefs
Living people
1950 births
American restaurant critics
American male non-fiction writers
James Beard Foundation Award winners
Vanderbilt family